Aidonochori is a village in the region of Serres, northern Greece. It belonged to the municipality of Tragilos until 2011, when the application of the Kallikratis Plan incorporated the entire municipality to the municipality of Visaltia. According to the 2011 Greek census, the village had 287 inhabitants.

History 
According to the statistics of the Bulgarian geographer Vasil Kanchov, the village had 1.500 Orthodox Greek inhabitants in 1900. The village was an autonomous community from 1920 until 1997, when it became part of the municipality of Tragilos. The singer Giannis Aggelakas is origined from the village.

References

Populated places in Serres (regional unit)